Musaabad or Moosa Abad or Musiabad or  Musi Abad or Musa Abad may refer to:

Chaharmahal and Bakhtiari Province
Musaabad, Kiar, a village in Kiar County
Musaabad, Kuhrang, a village in Kuhrang County

Hamadan Province
Musaabad, Asadabad, a village in Asadabad County
Musaabad, Nahavand, a village in Nahavand County

Isfahan Province
Musaabad, Dehaqan, a village in Dehaqan County
Musaabad, Isfahan, a village in Isfahan County
Musaabad, Nain, a village in Nain County
Musaabad Rural District, in Dehaqan County

Kerman Province
Musaabad, Rafsanjan, a village in Rafsanjan County
Musaabad, Rigan, a village in Rigan County

Lorestan Province
Musaabad-e Olya, a village in Kuhdasht County
Musaabad-e Sofla, a village in Kuhdasht County
Musaabad (33°49′ N 48°13′ E), Selseleh, a village in Selseleh County
Musaabad (33°51′ N 48°13′ E), Selseleh, a village in Selseleh County

Markazi Province
Musaabad, Ashtian, a village in Ashtian County
Musaabad, Kharqan, a village in Zarandieh County
Musaabad, Zarandieh, a village in Zarandieh County

Mazandaran Province
Musaabad, Mazandaran, a village in Nowshahr County

Razavi Khorasan Province
Musaabad, Chenaran, a village in Chenaran County
Musaabad, Fariman, a village in Fariman County
Musaabad, Torbat-e Jam, a village in Torbat-e Jam County

Tehran Province
Musaabad-e Bakhtiari, a village in Varamin County
Musaabad-e Kashani, a village in Varamin County

Yazd Province
Musaabad, Yazd, a village in Meybod County